Virginia's 15th Senate district is one of 40 districts in the Senate of Virginia. It has been represented by Republican Frank Ruff since 2000.

Geography
District 15 is a sprawling district based in Virginia's Southside, including all of Charlotte, Lunenburg, Mecklenburg, and Nottoway Counties, as well as parts of Brunswick, Campbell, Dinwiddie, Halifax, Pittsylvania, and Prince George Counties and part of the city of Danville. At over 4,200 square miles, District 15 is the largest Senate district in Virginia. It borders the state of North Carolina.

The district overlaps with Virginia's 4th, 5th, and 7th congressional districts, and with the 14th, 16th, 59th, 60th, 61st, 63rd, 64th, and 75th districts of the Virginia House of Delegates.

Recent election results

2019

2015

2011

Federal and statewide results in District 15

Historical results
All election results below took place prior to 2011 redistricting, and thus were under different district lines.

2007

2003

2000 special

1999

1995

References

Virginia Senate districts
Brunswick County, Virginia
Campbell County, Virginia
Charlotte County, Virginia
Danville, Virginia
Dinwiddie County, Virginia
Halifax County, Virginia
Lunenburg County, Virginia
Pittsylvania County, Virginia
Prince George County, Virginia
Mecklenburg County, Virginia
Nottoway County, Virginia